The name Cooper Monaco may refer to one of three different sports racing cars built by the Cooper Car Company between 1959 and 1964:

Cooper T49
Cooper T57
Cooper T61

Racing cars